Joel is an unincorporated community in Carroll County, in the U.S. state of Georgia.

History
A post office called Joel was established in 1881, and remained in operation until 1904. Joel F. Yates, an early postmaster, gave the community his first name.

References

Unincorporated communities in Carroll County, Georgia
Unincorporated communities in Georgia (U.S. state)